Köhnə Xudat (also, Kohna Khudat) is a village and municipality in the Qusar District of Azerbaijan. It has a population of 1,766.

References 

Populated places in Qusar District